Sophie Diouly (née Ngwamassana) is an Gabonese politician. 

She served as Minister of Justice in 1987-1989. 

She was the first woman cabinet minister in her country.

References

Government ministers of Gabon
20th-century women politicians
Women government ministers of Gabon